The Namaqua dune mole-rat (Bathyergus janetta) is a species of rodent in the family Bathyergidae found in Namibia and South Africa. Its natural habitats are subtropical or tropical dry shrubland, caves, and sandy shores.

The IUCN assessment states that :
 Although the extent of occurrence is less than 20,000 km², and the potential impact of diamond mining remains to be quantified, at present, there is no reason to believe that the species is declining, and its presence in areas entirely restricted to public access (and with extremely high protection) suggest it should be Least Concern.

References

</ref>

Bathyergus
Rodents of Africa
Mammals of Namibia
Mammals of South Africa
Mammals described in 1904
Taxa named by Oldfield Thomas
Taxonomy articles created by Polbot